The Indian Railways Institute of Signal Engineering and Telecommunication, Secunderabad is an Institute based on Signal Engineering and Telecommunications. Located in Secunderabad, this institute is run by the Ministry of Railways (India), Indian Railways in 1957 as a subsidiary of Indian Railways.

It caters to the specialized training needs of the Indian Railways' supervisors and officers in Railway Signalling and Telecommunication. It also trains officials of Foreign Railways.

Overview
In the first year of its existence it was concerned only with imparting training to Apprentices JE( junior engineers) Signal and Apprentice JE (junior engineers) Telecommunication, but subsequently, in view of the rapid developments in the field of Signaling and Telecommunication, several specialised technical training needs of Officers and Staff of Signal and Telecommunication Department in Signal Engineering, Telecommunications Technology, Electronics and Information Technology Training have also been introduced. Facilities available in this Institute are also extended to foreign nationals.

Related Institutes
The IRISET is one of six Centralised Training Institutes that share the task of training of officers. The other Centralised Training Institutes are:

 Indian Railways Institute of Civil Engineering, Pune for civil engineers,
 Indian Railways Institute of Electrical Engineering, Nasik for Electrical Engineers,
 Indian Railways Institute of Mechanical and Electrical Engineering & Jamalpur Gymkhana, Jamalpur for mechanical engineers
 Indian Railways Institute of Signal and Telecommunications Engineering, Secunderabad for engineers of S&T department,
 RPF Academy Lucknow, for officers of Railway Protection Force and
 As the alma mater the Railway Staff College (Now called National Academy of Indian Railways), Vadodara functions as the apex training institute for the officers of all departments in general and Accounts, Personnel, Stores, Traffic and Medical departments in particular.

External links
 Official website of IRISET

References

Training institutes of Indian Railways
1957 establishments in Andhra Pradesh
Educational institutions established in 1957